Mawase Rural LLG is a local-level government (LLG) of Sandaun Province, Papua New Guinea. A wide variety of Torricelli languages are spoken in this LLG.

Wards
01. Seleput (Siliput language speakers)
02. Nuku
03. Mantsuku
04. Yiminum
05. Ifkindu
06. Wilwil
07. Kaflei
08. Kaflei 3
09. Arkosame 1
10. Arkosame 2
11. Hambasama
12. Angara
13. Abigu
14. Usitamu
15. Hambanori
16. Engiep
17. Wombiu
21. Wulbowe
22. Tukinaro
28. Yilwombuk
29. Arkosome 3
30. Yirwondi (Seim language speakers)
31. Sepitala
32. Suau

References

Local-level governments of Sandaun Province